"Chasin' That Neon Rainbow" is a song written by American country music artist Alan Jackson and Jim McBride, and recorded by Jackson. It was released in September 1990 as the fourth single from Jackson's first album, Here in the Real World. The song peaked at number 2 on the Billboard Hot Country Singles & Tracks chart, and number 5 on the Canadian RPM Country Tracks chart.

Background and writing
Jackson recounts the song's origins in the album notes. "Jim McBride and I were writing together for the first time. We were talking about my life in Georgia and the experience of playing the honky tonk circuit. I remembered a radio that my daddy won when I was a young child and how my mama used to sing to my sisters and me. I also remembered how my mama hated for me to play in the bars. All those things set the story in motion, and within a few sessions, my life chasing that neon rainbow was set to music."

Content
The song recounts the narrator's life of trying to make it big as a country music artist.

Critical reception
Kevin John Coyne of Country Universe gave the song an A grade," calling the song "memorable" due to "an exuberant melody and decidedly country production, but the lyrics are anything but lightweight." He goes on to say that the song is "sung with a humble innocence, exudes boundless gratefulness and optimism for a budding career."

Music video
The music video was directed by Jack Cole and premiered on CMT on September 12, 1990. It depicts Jackson going to a bar to audition as a musical act for the bar. The ending of Jackson's next single (and first Number One), "I'd Love You All Over Again", is heard in the beginning of the video at the bar.

Peak chart positions

Year-end charts

References

1990 singles
Alan Jackson songs
Songs written by Alan Jackson
Song recordings produced by Scott Hendricks
Song recordings produced by Keith Stegall
Songs written by Jim McBride (songwriter)
Arista Nashville singles
1990 songs